Andriy Vyacheslavovych Chornovil was a self-nominated candidate in the 2004 Ukrainian presidential election. In the election he collected over 36,000 votes, placing 11th place.

He is an elder son of the famous Ukrainian dissident and a leader of People's Movement of Ukraine, Vyacheslav Chornovil. Andriy has a brother, Taras Chornovil. Andriy Chornovil is a deputy of Lviv regional council.  Since June 2004 he has been an Assistant Professor of Infection Illnesses at the National Medical University of Lviv. From 2002 to 2003, he was a leading expert at the board of health care of the Lviv Regional State Administration, and a senior inspector of Western regional customs.

References

External links
 Profile at the Central Election Commission

Living people
Candidates in the 2004 Ukrainian presidential election
Politicians from Lviv
1962 births